was a prominent Japanese Sōtō Zen teacher of the 20th century. He is considered to be one of the most significant Zen priests of his time for bringing Zen practice into the lives of laypeople and popularizing the ancient tradition of sewing the kesa. Peter Sloterdijk has called him "one of the most striking Zen masters of recent times."

Biography
Sawaki was born in Tsu, Mie on June 16, 1880. He was the sixth child and both his parents died when he was young, his mother when he was four and his father three years later. Sawaki was then adopted by an aunt whose husband soon died. After this, Sawaki was raised by a gambler and lantern maker named Bunkichi Sawaki.

When he was 16, he ran away from home to become a monk at Eihei-ji, one of the two head temples of the Sōtō Zen sect, and later traveled to Soshin-ji where he was ordained in 1899 by Koho Sawada. However, he was drafted to serve in the Imperial Japanese Army during the Russo-Japanese War of 1904–1905 to minister to the wounded.

After being discharged in 1906, Sawaki became head student at Soshin-ji. He received dharma transmission later that year from Zenko Sawada. He then studied for two years at the priests training school of Senju-ji, a Jōdo Shinshū temple in the Takada district of Tsu. From there, Sawaki traveled to Hōryū-ji to study Yogacara with Join Saeki. Sawaki then spent a three-month practice period studying Dōgen with Oka Sotan.

He later became a Zen teacher, and during the 1930s he served as a professor at Komazawa University. In 1949, he took responsibility for Antai-ji, a zen temple in northern Kyoto. Because of his regular travels throughout Japan to teach zen, and against tradition his not becoming a conventional abbot of a home temple, he came to be known as "Homeless Kodo" ("homeless" in the Japanese referring more to his lack of a temple than a residence). Sawaki died on December 21, 1965, at Antaiji. He was succeeded by a senior disciple, Kosho Uchiyama.

He is known for his rigorous emphasis on zazen, in particular the practice of shikantaza, or "just sitting". He often called Zen "wonderfully useless," discouraging any gaining idea or seeking after special experiences or states of consciousness.

Lineage

Dharma transmission to

Though Sawaki ordained many monks and nuns, only five monks and three nuns received Dharma Transmission (Shihō) from Sawaki:

 Shūyū Narita (1914–2004): students in Japan and Europe.
 Kosho Uchiyama (1912–1998): succeeded Sawaki as abbot of Antai-ji.
 Sodō Yokoyama (1907–1980): also called "Kusabue Zenji (Zen master of the grass-flute)".
 Satō Myōshin.
 Kōjun Kishigami (born 1941): lives in Japan; students in Japan, France and Germany.
 Jōshin Kasai (1920–1985): female, active in kesa sewing.
 Kōbun Okamoto (1925-?): female, active in kesa sewing.
 Baikō Fukuda: female, part time tenzô (cook) in Antaiji.

Influential students

Other influential students of Sawaki who did not receive Dharma transmission from him are:

 Gudo Wafu Nishijima (1919–2014)
 Taisen Deshimaru (1914–1982): went to France in 1967 and lived there for the rest of his life, establishing the Association Zen Internationale.
 Kōbun Chino Otogawa (1938-2002): taught many students over the years in the United States and Europe.

Bibliography

References

External links

 Sayings by Kodo Sawaki
 Seven chapters that were not included in the English translation of "The Zen Teaching of 'Homeless Kodo'" (Sayings by Kodo Sawaki with some texts by Kosho Uchiyama)
 tricycle: 17 frank pieces of life advice from a Zen master
 Zen teachings by Kodo Sawaki
 Life and spirit of Kōdō  Sawaki Biographical page at Antai-ji (in Japanese)
A tu, paraules zen plenes de vida  (zen teachings of Kõdõ Sawaki), El Bou Blanc Publicacions. www.sotozencatalunya.wordpress.com

Zen Buddhist monks
Japanese Zen Buddhists
Komazawa University alumni
1880 births
1965 deaths
Soto Zen Buddhists
People from Mie Prefecture
20th-century Buddhist monks